Ngubane is a South African surname that may refer to
Ben Ngubane (1941–2021), South African politician 
Menzi Ngubane (born 1964), South African actor 
Mlungisi Ngubane (born 1956), South African football player and coach
Silindile Ngubane (born 1987), South African football striker 
Sizani Ngubane, South African rural women's rights activist